This is a list of short story Irish writers either born in Ireland or holding Irish citizenship. Short story writers whose work is in Irish are included. 	
A brief outline of the history of Irish fiction is also available.

A–D

 Samuel Beckett (1906–1989)
 Maeve Binchy (1940–2012)
 Elizabeth Bowen (1899–1973) 
 Clare Boylan (1948–2006)
 Patrick Boyle (1905–1982) 
 Maeve Brennan (1917–1993)
 Donn Byrne (1889-1928)
 William Carleton (1794–1849)
 Joyce Cary (1888–1957)
 Patrick Chapman (born 1968)
 Padraic Colum (1881–1972) 
 Daniel Corkery (1878–1964)
 Julia Crottie (born 1853)
 Ita Daly (born 1945)
 Lord Dunsany (1878–1957)
 Martina Devlin

E–L

 Maria Edgeworth (1767–1849) 
 M. E. Francis (1859–1930)
 Brian Friel (1929–2015)
 Miriam Gallagher (born 1940)
 Gerald Griffin (1803–1840) 
 Jack Harte 
 Aidan Higgins (born 1927)
 Desmond Hogan (born 1951)
 Fred Johnston (born 1951)
 Neil Jordan (born 1950)
 James Joyce (1882–1941)
 Claire Keegan (born 1969)
 Maeve Kelly (born 1930)
 Benedict Kiely (born 1919)
 Mary Lavin (1912–1996)
 Sheridan Le Fanu (1814–1873)
 Edmund Leamy (1848–1904)

M–O

 Walter Macken (1915–1967) 
 John MacKenna (born 1952)
 Bernard MacLaverty (born 1942) 
 Michael McLaverty (1907–1992)
 Bryan MacMahon (1909–1998)
 Violet Florence Martin (1862–1923) of Somerville and Ross partnership
 Aidan Mathews (born 1956)
 Eugene McCabe (born 1930) 
 John McGahern (1934–2006)
 Janet McNeill (1907–1994)
 George McWhirter (born 1939)
 John Montague (born 1929)
 George Moore (1852–1933)
 Val Mulkerns (born 1925)
 C. E. Murphy (born 1973)
 David Murphy (born 1953) 
 Nuala Ní Chonchúir (born 1970)
 Éilís Ní Dhuibhne (born 1954)
 Edna O'Brien (born 1932)
 Kate Cruise O'Brien (born 1948) 
 Máirtín Ó Cadhain (1906–1970)
 Billy O'Callaghan (born 1974)
 Philip Ó Ceallaigh 
 Pádraic Ó Conaire (1882–1928) 
 Frank O'Connor (1903–1966)
 Mary O'Donnell (born 1954)
 Julia O'Faolain (born 1933)
 Seán Ó Faoláin (1900–1990) 
 Liam O'Flaherty (1896–1984) 
 Seumas O'Kelly (1881–1918)

P–Z

 James Plunkett (1920–2003)
 Lennox Robinson (1886–1958)
 Somerville and Ross (1858–1949 and 1862–1915)
 James Stephens (1882–1950) 
 Eithne Strong(1925–1999)
 Colm Tóibín (born 1955)
 William Trevor (born 1928)
 William Wall (born 1955)
 Liz Weir
 Oscar Wilde (1854–1900)

See also

Irish literature
Irish short story
List of Irish poets
List of Irish novelists
List of Irish dramatists

Short story writers
Irish